Gordshem Dona, sometimes written Goshen, Godshen or Donna (born 27 August 1996 or 7 June 1997) is a Vanuatuan footballer who plays as a defender for Vanuatuan club Malampa Revivors and the Vanuatu national team.

Club career
Donna started his career with the Teouma Academy, the national academy of Vanuatu. He started his career with Yatel and after one season he joined Vanuatuan top outfit Amicale.

National team
In 2017 Donna was called up for the Vanuatu national football team. He made his debut on November 23, 2017, in a 1–0 loss against Estonia when he played the whole 90 minutes.

References

External links
 Fiji Football Association profile

Vanuatuan footballers
Association football defenders
Amicale F.C. players
Vanuatu international footballers
Living people
1996 births
1997 births
Erakor Golden Star F.C. players
Vanuatu youth international footballers
Vanuatu under-20 international footballers
Yatel F.C. players